Pleasant Retreat is an unincorporated community in Scotland County, in the U.S. state of Missouri.

History
A post office called Pleasant Retreat was established in 1850, and remained in operation until 1901. The community was descriptively named.

References

Unincorporated communities in Scotland County, Missouri
Unincorporated communities in Missouri